Marlene Willoughby is an American former actor, pornographic film actor, and model.

Biography
Willoughby was born in Detroit, Michigan and sang in the local church choir growing up. In 1961 she moved to New York with her mother and older sister Jacqueline, who was pursuing a career as a singer.

She chose the surname "Willoughby" for her professional work after someone called her "willowy". She followed her older sister, Jacqueline Carol, in pursuing a career in show business.

In 1969 she appeared for eight months in the experimental Off-Off-Broadway play Che! by Lennox Raphael, where she played both a nymphomaniacal nun and Fidel Castro Other theater roles followed including the Obie Award–winning Dracula Sabbat, where she played the chief female vampire, Fuck Mother, and Keepers of the Hippo Horn.

Willoughby also landed parts in mainstream fare such as No Place to Hide (1970), Up the Sandbox (1972), I, the Jury (1982) and Trading Places (1983), and softcore work such as Voices of Desire (1972) and While the Cat's Away... (1972). Following her retirement from porn, she also appeared in the mainstream film Married to the Mob (1988).

Willoughby began making hardcore porn in 1975. Her notable appearances include The Opening of Misty Beethoven (1976), The Farmer's Daughters (1976), Outlaw Ladies (1981), and Foxtrot.

She appeared in many adult magazines, most notably the December 1980 issue of Penthouse, and also wrote columns for such magazines as High Society and Velvet. She also arranged film release parties and toured as a Burlesque dancer. During her career in porn Willoughby was known as an activist speaking out in favor of the porn industry.

References

External links
 
 
 

Living people
Year of birth unknown
Year of birth missing (living people)
American female adult models
American pornographic film actresses
Pornographic film actors from Michigan
Actresses from Detroit
American people of Polish descent
American people of Italian descent
American female erotic dancers
American erotic dancers
American women writers
American stage actresses
21st-century American women